Capote may refer to:

People
 Capote Band of Utes, a branch of the Ute people
 Truman Capote, an American author, screenwriter, playwright, and actor

Art, entertainment, and media
 Capote (film), a 2005 biographical film starring Philip Seymour Hoffman as Truman Capote

Other
 Capote (garment), an early 19th-century winter coat made with a wool blanket such as a Hudson's Bay point blanket
 Capote (horse), Champion American Thoroughbred racehorse
 Capote, the dress cape worn by a matador or torero
 Capote, a model of woman's bonnet (headgear)
 Kapoteh, sometimes spelled capote, a type of frock coat often worn by married Hasidic Jews